The large moth family Crambidae contains the following genera beginning with "Z":

References 

 Z
Crambid